St Johnstown was a borough constituency for Ballinalee or Saintjohnstown County Longford represented in the Irish House of Commons until 1800.

Members of Parliament

Notes

References

Historic constituencies in County Longford
Constituencies of the Parliament of Ireland (pre-1801)
1800 disestablishments in Ireland
Constituencies disestablished in 1800